Sammy Mwangi (born 3 June 1958) is a Kenyan boxer. He competed in the men's bantamweight event at the 1984 Summer Olympics.

References

1958 births
Living people
Kenyan male boxers
Olympic boxers of Kenya
Boxers at the 1984 Summer Olympics
Place of birth missing (living people)
Bantamweight boxers